Caíque França Godoy (born 3 June 1995) is a Brazilian footballer who plays as goalkeeper for Ponte Preta.

Professional career
Caíque made his professional debut for Corinthians in a 3-1 Campeonato Brasileiro Série A win over Botafogo on 19 June 2016. He would be given a cap again in an 8 November 2017 0-1 win over Atlético Paranaense, coming in as a substitute for an injured Walter, who was himself replacing first goalkeeper Cássio, who was with Brazil at the time. With Cássio out for Brazil and Walter injured, Caíque was Corinthians' goalkeeper for two more matches of the 2017 Campeonato Brasileiro Série A.

Honours
Corinthians
Campeonato Brasileiro Série A: 2017
Campeonato Paulista: 2017, 2018, 2019

References

External links
 
 Corinthians Profile 

1995 births
Living people
Footballers from São Paulo
Brazilian footballers
Association football goalkeepers
Campeonato Brasileiro Série A players
Campeonato Brasileiro Série B players
Sport Club Corinthians Paulista players
Oeste Futebol Clube players
Associação Atlética Ponte Preta players